Fort Point Channel is a maritime channel separating South Boston from downtown Boston, Massachusetts, feeding into Boston Harbor. The south part of it has been gradually filled in for use by the South Bay rail yard and several highways (specifically the Central Artery and the Southeast Expressway). At its south end, the channel once widened into South Bay, from which the Roxbury Canal continued southwest where the Massachusetts Avenue Connector is now.  The Boston Tea Party occurred at its northern end. The channel is surrounded by the Fort Point neighborhood, which is also named after the same colonial-era fort.

The banks of the channel are still busy with activity. South of Summer Street on the west side of the channel is a large United States Postal Service facility. A large parcel, home to Gillette, lies at the southeast corner of the channel. The back of the Federal Reserve Bank of Boston building looks over the channel, and another federal building, the John Joseph Moakley United States Courthouse, lies on Fan Pier at the mouth of the channel. One of Boston's odder attractions, the Hood Milk Bottle, lies on the banks as well, next to Boston Children's Museum. During the 1980s, a nightclub and popular concert venue called The Channel was located on the South Boston bank.

On October 21, 2011, Fort Point Pier opened for public use south of the Summer Street Bridge. To prepare for construction, a  section of the Fort Point Channel seawall south of Necco Court was restored by P&G Gillette. Public access has made Fort Point Channel popular for kayaking and standup paddle boarding.

Crossings

The following bridges and tunnels cross or used to cross the channel, from north to south, with building/opening dates:
Northern Avenue Bridge
Evelyn Moakley Bridge (New Northern Avenue/Seaport Boulevard)
Silver Line tunnel
Congress Street Bridge, 1930 (replaced an 1874-built swing bridge at same location)
Summer Street Bridge, 1899
New York and New England Railroad (gone)
Mount Washington Avenue Bridge (gone)
Fort Point Channel tunnel (I-90)
Dorchester Avenue Bridge (formerly Federal Street Bridge)
Atlantic Avenue Viaduct (gone)
New York, New Haven and Hartford Railroad and the wye connection to the west-facing lines (now used by the MBTA Commuter Rail) and the Red Line tunnel roughly underneath
Broadway Bridge (relocated, new bridge opened January 19, 1999 )
The channel now ends here; the remaining bridges cross the South Bay Yard.
West Fourth Street Bridge, 1958 (formerly Dover Street, with an older bridge)
South Boston Bypass Road
New York and New England Railroad on a long diagonal bridge, now used by the MBTA Commuter Rail and trains to the South Boston Freight Terminal - this bridge passed under the next two
Southampton Street (formerly Swett Street)
Massachusetts Avenue (formerly East Chester Park)

See also
The Channel
Children's Wharf
Fort Point, Boston
Fort Point Channel Historic District
South Station

References

 Fort Point Channel Watersheet Activation Plan

External links
 Friends of Fort Point Channel
 City of Boston's free walking tour of Fort Point
 Fort Point Channel Boston
Fort Point Pier

South Boston
Financial District, Boston
Channels of the United States
Landforms of Boston
Cultural history of Boston
Bodies of water of Massachusetts
Seaport District